The diocese of Antipirgo is a suppressed and titular see  of the Roman Catholic Church.

Of this ancient diocese only one bishop, Emiliano, is known; he was among the bishops who attended the Second Council of Constantinople in 553. Today Antipirgo survives as a titular bishopric, and the seat is vacant since March 6, 1969.

Known Bishops
 Emiliano  (fl.553)
 Luigi Ermenegildo Ricci, (1922–1931)
 John Chang Pi-te (1932–1946)
 Riccardo Ramos de Castro Vilela (1946–1958)
 Wilhelm Tuschen (1958–1961)
 Myles McKeon (1962–1969)

References

Roman towns and cities
Catholic titular sees in Africa